The Mishler Theatre is a Beaux-Arts stage and movie theater located at 1208 Twelfth Avenue in Altoona, Pennsylvania.

History 
It was designed by Albert E. Westover and built by local theatre owner and manager Isaac Charles Mishler and opened on February 15, 1906. Nine months later, the neighboring Rothert building caught fire, which quickly spread to the theater, destroying the interior. The theater was rebuilt and re-opened in 1907.

In 1924, Isaac Mishler announced his retirement and later sold the theatre in 1931.

After disuse in the mid-20th century, the theatre was considered for demolition in 1965. In response, the Altoona Community Theatre and the Blair County Arts Foundation purchased it and began renovations. When the theatre reopened in 1969, their inaugural performance was The Sound of Music.

It was added to the National Register of Historic Places in 1973, and is located in the Downtown Altoona Historic District.

Restoration
Early renovations included replacement of the seats and the lobby's chandelier with the new one purchased in 1970 at a Metro-Goldwyn-Mayer auction. Major structural, plumbing, and electrical work began in the early 1990s. At the most recent estimate, the restoration has cost more than $1 million.

References

External links
BCAF's photo gallery of the Mishler Theatre.
 

Theatres on the National Register of Historic Places in Pennsylvania
Buildings and structures in Altoona, Pennsylvania
Theatres in Pennsylvania
Tourist attractions in Blair County, Pennsylvania
Historic American Buildings Survey in Pennsylvania
Altoona, Pennsylvania
National Register of Historic Places in Blair County, Pennsylvania
Cinemas and movie theaters in Pennsylvania
Individually listed contributing properties to historic districts on the National Register in Pennsylvania
Theatres completed in 1906
1906 establishments in Pennsylvania